The 2019 Copa Bicentenario was played between June and July while the Peru national football team prepared for and competed in the 2019 Copa América. The tournament was played as a knockout competition, with the participation of the 18 teams of the Liga 1, and 12 teams of the Liga 2. 
The champions will qualify for the 2020 Copa Sudamericana.

Teams

Stadia and locations

Group stage

Group A

Group B

Group C

Group D

Group E

Group F

Group G

Group H

Knockout stage

Bracket

Round of 16

Quarterfinals

Semifinals

First leg

Second leg

Final

Top goalscorers

See also
 2019 Torneo de Promoción y Reserva
 2019 Liga 2
 2019 Copa Perú

References

External links
Official website 
Tournament regulations 
Torneo Descentralizado news at Peru.com 
Torneo Descentralizado statistics and news at Dechalaca.com 

2019
2019 in Peruvian football
Peru